Fall Into Madness is Steel Attack's second album, released in 2001.
The second album by Swedish power metal quartet, Steel Attack, is beyond comparison. They're original power metal feel is still intact from the first album, Where Mankind Fails, but with improved vocals by Steven Steel, some added keyboards, and a better production that brings out the best from all its talented members. The first track, "Fall into Madness", is possibly the best song they've ever written, with unreal guitar work, very powerful drums, and great chorus arrangements. All tracks are fast and furious, with the exception of "Holy Swordsman" which shows Steel Attack displaying a heavy and awesome groove.

Track listing

Credits
line up:
Steve Steel - vocals & bass
Dennis Vestman - guitar
John Allan - guitar
Roger Raw - drums
guest: Petri Kuusisto - keyboards
Produced By: Steel Attack and Pelle Saether
Recorded in Studio Underground by Pelle Saether
Mixed in Studio Underground by Pelle Saether
Mastered in Cutting Room by Peter In de Betou
Artwork by: JP Fournier

2001 albums
Steel Attack albums
AFM Records albums
Albums with cover art by Jean-Pascal Fournier